Aradus depressus is a true bug in the family Aradidae. The species is found in the Palearctic from Ireland East to Siberia. In the Southeast, the range extends to the Caucasus mountains. A. depressus is the most common species of the genus Aradus and can be found everywhere.

Aradus depressus lives in hardwoods infested by fungi, such as Trametes and Oxyporus. Both nymphs and adults prefer  birch Betula, but they are also found at Acer, oak Quercus
, Elm Ulmus, willow Salix, poplar Populus, beech Fagus, alder Alnus and apples Malus. There are also indications in the literature. that they live exceptionally well on pine Pinus. 
The females readily fly from mid-April to the end of May, often far away from potential habitats.

References
Ekkehard Wachmann, Albert Melber, Jürgen Deckert: Wanzen. Band 3: Pentatomomorpha I: Aradoidea (Rindenwanzen), Lygaeoidea (Bodenwanzen u. a.), Pyrrhocoroidea (Feuerwanzen) und Coreoidea (Randwanzen u. a.)''. (= Die Tierwelt Deutschlands und der angrenzenden Meeresteile nach ihren Merkmalen und nach ihrer Lebensweise. 78. Teil). Goecke & Evers, Keltern 2007,

External links
British Bugs
Aradus depressus images at  Consortium for the Barcode of Life

Aradidae